JDS Arashio (SS-565) was the fourth boat of thes. She was commissioned on 25 July 1969.

Construction and career
Arashio was laid down at Mitsubishi Heavy Industries Kobe Shipyard on 5 July 1967 and launched on 24 October 1968. She was commissioned on 25 July 1969, into the 1st Submarine Group Joined the 2nd Submarine.

She participated in dispatch training in Hawaii from September 6 to November 24, 1972.

On 27 March 1985, she became the flagship of the 1st Submarine Group.

She was decommissioned on 27 March 1986 and scrapped by Furusawa Steel in 1989.

Gallery

Citations

External links

1968 ships
Asashio-class submarines
Ships built by Mitsubishi Heavy Industries